Krasny May is a rural locality (a settlement) in Pavlozavodsky Selsoviet, Pavlovsky District, Altai Krai, Russia. The population was 219 as of 2013. There are 3 streets.

Geography 
Krasny May is located 13 km east of Pavlovsk (the district's administrative centre) by road. Sibirskiye Ogni and Chernopyatovo are the nearest rural localities.

References 

Rural localities in Pavlovsky District, Altai Krai